Prince Johann Ferdinand of Auersperg (29 September 1655, in Vienna – 6 August 1705, in Ziębice, in Silesia) was the second Prince of Auersperg and Duke of Silesia-Münsterberg from 1677 until his death.

His father Johann Weikhard of Auersperg (1615–1677) was a hereditary Imperial Prince and in 1654, Emperor Ferdinand III, in his capacity as King of Bohemia, had enfeoffed him with the Duchy of Münsterberg and City of Frankenstein.

In 1678, Johann Ferdinand married Countess Anna Maria of Herberstein (1660–1726).  They had a daughter, Maria Theresa of Auersperg (1686–1756), who married Count Georg Siegmund of Auersperg-Kirchberg.

Johann Ferdinand died in 1705.  As he had no sons, he was succeeded by his brother Franz Karl of Auersperg.

External links

Footnotes 

Principality of Auersperg
Dukes of Germany
1655 births
1705 deaths